The 1996 NASCAR Craftsman Truck Series was the second season of the Craftsman Truck Series, the third highest stock car racing series sanctioned by NASCAR in the United States. Ron Hornaday Jr. of Dale Earnhardt, Inc. won the championship.

ESPN and TNN broadcast eight races each. CBS carried five races while TBS aired three races.

Teams and drivers

Full-time schedule 
List of full-time teams at the start of 1996.

Part-Time schedule

Races

Florida Dodge Dealers 400 

The inaugural Florida Dodge Dealers 400 was held March 17 at Homestead-Miami Speedway. Geoff Bodine won the pole. The race was broadcast on TNN.

Top ten results

7-Dave Rezendes
24-Jack Sprague
16-Ron Hornaday Jr.
94-Ron Barfield Jr.
44-Bryan Reffner
27-Terry McCarthy
8-John Nemechek
42-Jay Sauter -1
00-Frank Kimmel -1
21-Doug George -1

Chevrolet Desert Star 300 

The Chevrolet Desert Star 300 was held April 21 at Phoenix International Raceway. Mike Skinner won the pole. The race was broadcast on TNN.

Top ten results

24-Jack Sprague
3-Mike Skinner
98-Butch Miller
44-Bryan Reffner
16-Ron Hornaday Jr.
6-Rick Carelli
80-Joe Ruttman
94-Ron Barfield Jr.
75-Bobby Gill
64-Michael Dokken -1

Craftsman 200 

The Craftsman 200 was held May 4 at Portland Speedway. Rich Bickle won the pole. The race was broadcast by TBS.

Top ten results

16-Ron Hornaday Jr.
2-Mike Bliss
3-Mike Skinner
17-Bill Sedgwick
98-Butch Miller
6-Rick Carelli
44-Bryan Reffner
24-Jack Sprague
80-Joe Ruttman
30-Jimmy Hensley

Jerr-Dan/Nelson Truck 200 

The Jerr-Dan/Nelson Truck 200 was held May 11 at Evergreen Speedway. Tobey Butler won the pole. The race was broadcast on TBS.

Top ten results

2-Mike Bliss
16-Ron Hornaday Jr.
53-Dan Press
43-Rich Bickle
3-Mike Skinner
52-Tobey Butler
30-Jimmy Hensley
80-Joe Ruttman
94-Ron Barfield Jr.
17-Bill Sedgwick -1

NAPA 200 

The NAPA 200 was held May 25 at Tucson Raceway Park. Bryan Reffner won the pole. The race was broadcast on ESPN.

Top ten results

3-Mike Skinner
43-Rich Bickle
16-Ron Hornaday Jr.
30-Jimmy Hensley
24-Jack Sprague
17-Bill Sedgwick
75-Bobby Gill
7-Dave Rezendes
64-Michael Dokken
29-Bob Keselowski

Colorado 250 

The Colorado 250 was held June 1 at Colorado National Speedway. Rich Bickle won the pole. The race was broadcast on CBS.

Top ten results

3-Mike Skinner
98-Butch Miller
30-Jimmy Hensley
24-Jack Sprague
7-Dave Rezendes
80-Joe Ruttman
17-Bill Sedgwick
16-Ron Hornaday Jr.
42-Jay Sauter
21-Doug George

Lund Look 225 

The Lund Look 225 was held June 9 at Heartland Park Topeka. Ron Hornaday Jr. won the pole. The race was broadcast on TNN.

Top ten results

3-Mike Skinner
24-Jack Sprague
16-Ron Hornaday Jr.
2-Mike Bliss
42-Jay Sauter
18-Johnny Benson
52-Ken Schrader
99-Jeff Burton
7-Dave Rezendes
17-Bill Sedgwick

Coca-Cola 200 

The Coca-Cola 200 was held June 22 at Bristol Motor Speedway. Mike Skinner won the pole. On lap 162 Mike Bliss crashed on the front stretch where he hit and rode up the wall and tore down a part of the catch fencing. The race was broadcast on ESPN.

Top ten results

6-Rick Carelli
7-Dave Rezendes
42-Jay Sauter
3-Mike Skinner
24-Jack Sprague
80-Joe Ruttman
75-Bobby Gill
16-Ron Hornaday Jr.
19-Lance Norick -1
20-Walker Evans -1

DeVilbiss Superfinish 200 

The inaugural DeVilibiss Superfinish 200 was held June 30 at Nazareth Speedway. Jimmy Hensley won the pole. The race was supposed to air on CBS; however, after a 3 hour rain delay, CBS left the speedway, and therefore the race was not broadcast. This was the only Truck Series start for Rusty Wallace.

Top ten results

24-Jack Sprague
30-Jimmy Hensley
98-Butch Miller
99-Jeff Burton
16-Ron Hornaday Jr.
18-Johnny Benson
80-Joe Ruttman
07-Geoff Bodine
22-Rusty Wallace
44-Bryan Reffner

Sears Auto Center 200 

The Sears Auto Center 200 was held July 6 at The Milwaukee Mile. Mike Bliss won the pole. The race was broadcast on CBS.

Top ten results

24-Jack Sprague
17-Bill Sedgwick
16-Ron Hornaday Jr.
30-Jimmy Hensley
2-Mike Bliss
75-Bobby Gill
3-Mike Skinner
7-Dave Rezendes -1
15-Mark Gibson -2
65-Kenny Allen -2

Ford Dealers 225 

The Ford Dealers 225 was held July 20 at Louisville Motor Speedway. Mike Bliss won the pole. The race was broadcast on CBS.

Top ten results

16-Ron Hornaday Jr.
3-Mike Skinner
30-Jimmy Hensley
7-Dave Rezendes
80-Joe Ruttman
44-Bryan Reffner
6-Rick Carelli
24-Jack Sprague
98-Butch Miller
8-John Nemechek

Western Auto 200 

The Western Auto 200 was held July 27 at I-70 Speedway. Butch Miller won the pole. On lap 121 Bob Keselowski crashed in turn 1, broke the wall and rolled down the banking 2 1/2 times. The race was broadcast on TNN.

Top ten results

2-Mike Bliss
3-Mike Skinner
6-Rick Carelli
16-Ron Hornaday Jr.
17-Bill Sedgwick
21-Doug George
75-Nathan Buttke -1
30-Jimmy Hensley -1
7-Dave Rezendes -1
43-Rich Bickle -1

Cummins 200 

The Cummins 200 was held August 1 at Indianapolis Raceway Park. Mike Skinner won the pole. The race was broadcast on ESPN.

Top ten results

3-Mike Skinner
24-Jack Sprague
2-Mike Bliss
16-Ron Hornaday Jr.
43-Rich Bickle
42-Jay Sauter
22-Kenny Wallace
75-Nathan Buttke
66-Mike McLaughlin
4-Tony Stewart

 Mike Skinner lead flag to flag (all 200 laps).

Stevens Beil/Genuine Parts 200 

The Stevens Beil/Genuine Parts 200 was held August 10 at Flemington Speedway. Bryan Reffner won the pole. The race was broadcast on TNN.

Top ten results

3-Mike Skinner
2-Mike Bliss
43-Rich Bickle
7-Dave Rezendes
24-Jack Sprague
16-Ron Hornaday Jr.
6-Rick Carelli
33-Harry Gant
30-Jimmy Hensley
98-Butch Miller -1

Parts America 150 

The Parts America 150 was held August 25 at Watkins Glen International. Steve Park won the pole qualifying the truck driven by Joe Nemechek. The race was broadcast on ESPN.

Top ten results

16-Ron Hornaday Jr.
87-Joe Nemechek
3-Mike Skinner
24-Jack Sprague
43-Rich Bickle
80-Joe Ruttman
27-Rob Rizzo
30-Jimmy Hensley
21-Doug George
20-Walker Evans

Federated Auto Parts 250 

The Federated Auto Parts 250 was held August 31 at Nashville Speedway USA. Jack Sprague won the pole. The race was broadcast on TNN.

Top ten results

7-Dave Rezendes
16-Ron Hornaday Jr.
24-Jack Sprague
98-Butch Miller
44-Bryan Reffner
21-Doug George
64-Michael Dokken
30-Jimmy Hensley
6-Rick Carelli
2-Mike Bliss -1

Fas Mart Truck Shootout 

The Fas Mart Truck Shootout was held September 5 at Richmond International Raceway. Kenny Irwin Jr. won the pole. The race was shortened to 124 laps due to rain from Hurricane Fran. The race was broadcast on ESPN.

Top ten results

3-Mike Skinner
16-Ron Hornaday Jr.
99-Mark Martin
80-Joe Ruttman
62-Kenny Irwin Jr.
75-Nathan Buttke
98-Butch Miller
33-Harry Gant
5-Darrell Waltrip
52-Tobey Butler

Pennzoil/VIP Tripleheader 

The Pennzoil/VIP Tripleheader was held September 8 at New Hampshire International Speedway. Mike Skinner won the pole. The race was broadcast on TNN.

Top ten results

16-Ron Hornaday Jr.
24-Jack Sprague
2-Mike Bliss
18-Steve Park
28-Ernie Irvan
9-Joe Bessey
44-Bryan Reffner
80-Joe Ruttman
30-Jimmy Hensley -1
17-Bill Sedgwick -1

Hanes 250 

The Hanes 250 was held September 21 at Martinsville Speedway. Bobby Hamilton won the pole. The race was broadcast on ESPN.

Top ten results

3-Mike Skinner 
98-Butch Miller
24-Jack Sprague
16-Ron Hornaday Jr.
5-Darrell Waltrip
80-Joe Ruttman
43-Rich Bickle
99-Jeff Burton
30-Jimmy Hensley
33-Harry Gant

Lowe's 250 

The final Lowe's 250 was held September 28 at North Wilkesboro Speedway. Johnny Benson won the pole. The race was broadcast on ESPN.

Top ten results

99-Mark Martin
24-Jack Sprague
98-Butch Miller
22-Kenny Wallace
80-Joe Ruttman
6-Rick Carelli
18-Johnny Benson
43-Rich Bickle
3-Mike Skinner
5-Darrell Waltrip

Kragen 151 

The Kragen 151 was held October 7 at Sears Point Raceway. Mike Skinner won the pole. The race was broadcast on ESPN.

Top ten results

7-Dave Rezendes
16-Ron Hornaday Jr.
3-Mike Skinner
80-Joe Ruttman
21-Doug George
24-Jack Sprague
2-Mike Bliss
44-Bryan Reffner
6-Rick Carelli
30-Jimmy Hensley

Ford Dealers/Ford Credit 300 

The Ford Dealers/Ford Credit 300 was held October 14 at Mesa Marin Raceway. Ron Hornaday Jr. won the pole. The race was broadcast on TNN.

Top ten results

3-Mike Skinner
16-Ron Hornaday Jr.
80-Joe Ruttman
2-Mike Bliss
98-Butch Miller
21-Doug George
43-Rich Bickle
20-Walker Evans -1
7-Dave Rezendes -1

GM Goodwrench/AC Delco 300 

The GM Goodwrench/AC Delco 300 was held October 26 at Phoenix International Raceway. Jack Sprague won the pole. The race was broadcast on TBS.

Top ten results

24-Jack Sprague
18-Johnny Benson
80-Joe Ruttman
3-Mike Skinner
99-Ted Musgrave
52-Tobey Butler
16-Ron Hornaday Jr.
87-Joe Nemechek
21-Doug George
33-Harry Gant

Carquest 420K 

The Carquest 420K was held November 3 at Las Vegas Motor Speedway. Bryan Reffner won the pole. The race was broadcast on CBS.

Top ten results

24-Jack Sprague
4-Bill Elliott
80-Joe Ruttman
1-Michael Waltrip
7-Dave Rezendes
18-Robby Gordon
3-Mike Skinner
52-Ken Schrader
44-Bryan Reffner
16-Ron Hornaday Jr.

Final points standings

Drivers

Rookie of the Year 
Bryan Reffner was named the 1996 Craftsman Truck Series Rookie of the year, winning three poles and finishing ninth in points. He was followed by Doug George, who had eight top-tens over the course of the season, and Lance Norick, who split the season between two different teams. Bobby Gill began the year with Spears Motorsports, but was released. Jay Sauter and Lonnie Cox ran abbreviated schedules for their teams.

See also
 1996 NASCAR Winston Cup Series
 1996 NASCAR Busch Series

References 
Craftsman Truck Series standings and statistics for 1996 - Racing-Reference.info

NASCAR Truck Series seasons